Ekaterine Gorgodze was the defending champion but chose not to participate.

Kateřina Siniaková won the title, defeating Magda Linette in the final, 6–4, 6–1.

Seeds
All seeds receive a bye into the second round.

Draw

Finals

Top half

Section 1

Section 2

Bottom half

Section 3

Section 4

References

External links
Main draw

Polish Open - Singles